A running back (RB) is a member of the offensive backfield in gridiron football. The primary roles of a running back are to receive handoffs from the quarterback to rush the ball, to line up as a receiver to catch the ball, and block. There are usually one or two running backs on the field for a given play, depending on the offensive formation. A running back may be a halfback (in certain contexts also referred to as a "tailback" ⁠ ⁠—  see below), a wingback or a fullback. A running back will sometimes be called a "feature back" if he is the team's starting running back.

Halfback/tailback

The halfback (HB) or tailback (TB) position is responsible for carrying the ball on the majority of running plays, and may frequently be used as a receiver on short (or sometimes long, depending on the system) passing plays.

In the modern game, an effective halfback must have a blend of both quickness and agility as a runner, as well as sure hands and good vision up-field as a receiver. Quarterbacks depend on halfbacks as a safety valve or checkdown receiver when primary targets downfield are covered or when they are under pressure. Occasionally, halfbacks line up as additional wide receivers.

When not serving either of these functions, the primary responsibility of a halfback is to aid the offensive linemen in blocking, either to protect the quarterback or another player carrying the football. If a team uses a Wildcat formation, often the halfback—instead of the quarterback—is the one who directly receives the snap. As a trick play, running backs are occasionally used to pass the ball on a halfback option play or halfback pass.

The difference between halfback and tailback is the position of the player in the team's offensive formation. In historical formations, the halfback lined up approximately halfway between the line of scrimmage and the fullback (similarly, quarterbacks lined up a quarter of the distance between the line of scrimmage and the fullback). Because the halfback is usually the team's main ball carrier (while the fullback is primarily a blocker), modern offensive formations have positioned the halfback behind the fullback (at the "tail end" of the formation), to take advantage of the fullback's blocking abilities. As a result, some systems or playbooks will call for a tailback as opposed to a halfback.

In Canadian football, the term tailback is often used interchangeably with running back, while the use of the term halfback is often exclusively reserved for the defensive halfback, which refers to the defensive back halfway between the linebackers and the cornerbacks.

Fullback

In most modern college and professional football schemes, fullbacks (FB) carry the ball infrequently, instead using their stronger physiques as primary "lead blockers". On most running plays, the fullback leads the halfback, attempting to block potential tacklers before they reach the ball carrier.

When fullbacks are called upon to carry the ball, the situation typically calls for gaining a short amount of yardage, such as scoring from the goal line, as the fullback can use his bulkiness to avoid being tackled early. While fullbacks do act as an eligible receiver, most plays call for the fullback to remain in the backfield and block any defensive players who make it past the offensive line, a skill referred to as "blitz pickup". Fullbacks are technically running backs, but today the term "running back" is usually used in referring to the halfback or tailback. Although modern fullbacks are rarely used as ball carriers, in previous offensive schemes fullbacks would be the designated ball carriers.

In high school football, where player sizes vary greatly, fullbacks are still frequently used as ball carriers. In high school and college offenses, the triple option scheme uses the fullback as a primary ball carrier. The fullback plays a unique role by establishing an inside running threat on every play. College teams such as Georgia Tech and Air Force have employed the triple option scheme.

While in years past the fullback lined up on the field for almost every offensive play, teams often opt to replace the fullback with an additional wide receiver or a tight end in modern football. Fullbacks in the National Football League today rarely carry or catch the ball, since they are used almost exclusively as blockers. Fullbacks are also still used occasionally as rushers on plays when a short gain is needed for a first-down or touchdown or to surprise the defense since they are usually not expecting a full back to run or catch the ball.  In the past, fullbacks could even be a team's features back, using their larger size and strength as a "power rusher" to dominate the ground game. Pro Football Hall of Fame members Jim Brown, Marion Motley, Franco Harris, John Riggins, and Larry Csonka were fullbacks.

Characteristics of a running back

Height and weight

There is a diversity in those who play at the running back position. At one extreme are smaller (5'4"–5'10"), shiftier players. These quick, agile, and elusive running backs are often called "scat backs" because their low center of gravity and maneuverability allow them to dodge tacklers. Running backs known for their elusiveness include Red Grange, Hugh McElhenny, Gale Sayers, and Barry Sanders.

At the other extreme are "power backs:" bigger, stronger players who can break through tackles using brute strength and raw power. They are usually slower runners compared to other backs, and typically run straight ahead (or "North-and-South" in football terminology) rather than dodging to the outside edges of the playing field. Hall of Famers Earl Campbell, Bronko Nagurski, John Riggins, and Larry Csonka, as well as NFL all-time leading rusher Emmitt Smith, were considered power running backs. Derrick Henry, Mark Ingram II, Carlos Hyde, Nick Chubb, Kareem Hunt, and Leonard Fournette are all examples of current NFL power running backs.

More recently the NFL has turned to running backs who combine those traits such as Atlanta Falcons' Todd Gurley, Dallas Cowboys' Ezekiel Elliott, Minnesota Vikings’ Dalvin Cook, and New York Giants' Saquon Barkley. These backs combine elusiveness with power and patience as well as receiving ability and blocking to become an all around, three-down backs.

Receiving ability
Over the years, NFL running backs have been used as receivers out of the backfield. On passing plays, a running back will often run a "safe route", such as a hook or a flat route, that gives a quarterback a target when all other receivers are covered or when the quarterback feels pressured. Hall of Famer Lenny Moore was a halfback who played primarily as a pass receiver.

Christian McCaffrey, a running back for the San Francisco 49ers, is one of few players to have 1000 yards rushing and 1000 yards receiving in the same season in 2019. Some teams have a specialist "third down back", who is skilled at catching passes or better at pass blocking and "picking up the blitz", and thus is often put in the game on third down and long. It can also be used to fool the defense by making them think it is being put into the game for a pass play, when the play is actually a run. James White of the New England Patriots is used as a third-down back, or as an extra wide receiver. His receiving statistics exceed his rushing statistics, with 3,184 yards and 25 receiving touchdowns on 369 receptions, compared to 1,240 yards and 10 rushing touchdowns on 309 carries.

Blocking
Running backs are also required to help the offensive line in passing situations, and, in the case of the fullback, running plays. Running backs will regularly block blitzing linebackers or safeties on passing plays when the offensive line is occupied with the defensive linemen. On running plays, the fullback will often attempt to create a hole in the offensive line for the running back to run through. Effective blocking backs are usually key components for a running back's success. On passing plays, a running back will stay back to help block and pick up the blitz

Goal line backs
Many teams also have a running back designated as a "goal line back" or "short yardage specialist". This running back comes into the game in short yardage situations when the offense needs only a little bit of yardage to get a first down or a touchdown. Normally, when an offense gets inside the 5-yard line it sends in its goal line formation, which usually includes eight blockers, a quarterback, a running back, and a fullback. The closer it is to the goal line, the more likely it is to use this formation. If a certain running back is used often near the goal line, he may be called the "goal line back." Short yardage and goal line backs often are power backs who are not prone to fumbling, who muscle through or push a large mass of defenders to get the first down or touchdown.

As kick and punt returners
Running backs are sometimes called upon to return punts and kickoffs, a role usually filled by wide receivers and cornerbacks, who are generally among the fastest players on the team. A running back, Brian Mitchell, currently holds the NFL records for career kickoff return yards (14,014 yards) and career punt return yards (4,999 yards).

References

External links
Football 101: Basic Football positions

American football positions